Sport industry is an industry in which people, activities, business, and organizations are involved in producing, facilitating, promoting, or organizing any activity, experience, or business enterprise focused on sports. It is the market in which the businesses or products offered to its buyers are sports related and may be goods, services, people, places, or ideas.

Professional sports in the United States
The most major of industries related to sports are the professional leagues that most of the other industries in the sporting world revolve around. The major American sports leagues are the first five in the list following and include football, basketball, hockey, baseball and soccer. Most players in these leagues make money from the team they're on as well as sponsors but are among some of the top earners in the United States.

Examples

Sports apparel 

Sports apparel includes a wide array of clothing articles from fan-based jerseys to actual equipment to play the different sports with. There are many retailers out there including online and in-person that offer a plethora of these products. Many of these businesses have professional athletes that endorse them, securing them fans and buyers alike.

Examples

Sports gambling 

Sports gambling is something that just recently became legalized in the United States. It involves making wagers based on some outcome of a contest or some aspect within the contest. In prior instances of legality, there were multiple incidents of professional athletes/referees committing scandals to increase payouts. The people placing the bets always have worse odds than those hosting the bets and that is how this industry remains profitable.

Sports Betting although PASPA (The Professional and Amateur Sports Protection Act of 1992 (Pub.L. 102–559) was overturned in May 2018, the individual states are still considering what methods (brick and mortar and online) of sports gambling to allow and where. For example, sports gambling, in certain US states and jurisdictions, may be allowed in established casinos or race tracks. Thus partnerships between bookmakers and gambling license holders will need to be in effect and active before taking any sports bets at venues.

Other considerations regarding legal sports betting remain clear:  Offshore sportsbooks and bookmakers operating offshore cannot solicit or do business with American citizens. The 1961 Federal Wire Act - The Wire Act prohibits persons involved in the gambling business from transmitting several types of wagering-related communications over the wires. This basically means that online and telephone sports gambling is still not allowed in the United States. The memo issued by the DOJ in January 2019 can be downloaded here.

Companies offering free sports gambling games known as freemium or F2P games remain unregulated. Fantasy Sports considered by experts as skill games are questionable in certain US jurisdictions. 32 states have either allowed or regulated fantasy sports during the past few years, before the PASPA overturning.

Examples 
 MyBookie 
 Betfun Entertainment (freemium - no cash branded sports gambling games)
 SportsBetting
 GTbets
 BetOnline
 Bovada

Sports stadium/travel 
Sports are often played in giant arenas that people travel to from all over. People will cross the world to see their favorite team play and some signature arenas can get fans there even if the team isn't having the best season. The construction/ adaption of these stadiums is a huge business in its own as they're often multi-purpose places used for other things like music events as well. The transportation of the players themselves is also a crucial business as keeping them safe and getting them to where they need to be on time can be a hassle.

Examples 
Sports-Related Corporate Travel
Team and sports event part. travel
Adventure and sports fantasy travel
Recreational transport
Sport event travel
Spectator Sports revenue
Stadium and Arena Construction
Sports sponsorship expenditure

Sports supplements/medicine 

Athletes all over try to get an edge on the competition in any way possible. Over time companies have developed supplements that allows these athletes to train harder, stronger and longer. Combining these supplements with the right workout regime and diet can lead to better overall results for any athlete at any level of competition. While supplements are the former when it comes to sports training, sports medicine tends to be the latter. When an injury deals a great blow to an athlete they look to some of the world's best doctors who have a history of dealing with similar problems to help them overcome their damage.

Examples 
 Power Bar
 Gatorade
 Powerade
 Whey protein
 Creatine
 GNC
 Physical therapy
 Nutritionists

Sports memorabilia 

Sports memorabilia takes many forms from signed clothing to trading cards. Fans take much pride in owning something their favorite athlete once used or signed and there are a plethora of hole in the wall hobby shops that have items like these for sale. Many of these hobby shops also host meet and greets for fans to meet their favorite players.

Examples 
 Topps Cards
 Steiner Sports

Sports marketing 

Sports marketing is being highly influenced by changes in technology stirred in with social media, according to a report entitled The Future of Sports, published by TheFuture.org. As sports clubs, franchises and professional athletes leverage on technology tied to social media networks and platforms to boost their marketing efforts and engage with fans the impact is felt in sports marketing economics. Digital mobile games, digital video contents, fan-created contents using league footage, fantasy sports games, and other sports-themed digital media is on the rise. Sports marketing in its digital format is almost presence everywhere in major sports brands from club to retailer. Compared to 1990, sports marketing has not only changed from static to digital but in terms of economic impact has seen exponential growth. The availability to use stats in almost real-time has also impacted sports marketing in the sports gambling industry. Bookmakers are now able to market using an occurrence from a few minutes or even seconds ago.

Examples 
 Whistle Sports
 Bleacher Report
 The Players' Tribune
 Vice Sports
 Sports Kitchen Entertainment Group
 NBA Playmakers TV

See also
List of outdoor industry parent companies
Ultimate Sports Marketing Guide

References 

 
Industries (economics)